Why Not Model Management is a modeling agency based in Milan, Italy, and founded by Tiziana Casali and Vittorio Zeviani in 1976.

Models
Models and talent currently and previously represented by the agency include:
 Aamito Lagum
 Adam Senn
 Agyness Deyn
 Amy Wesson
 Bette Franke
 Catherine McNeil
 Cintia Dicker
 Denisa Dvořáková
 Edita Vilkevičiūtė
 Élise Crombez
 Enikő Mihalik
 Evandro Soldati
 Francisco Lachowski
 Gracie Carvalho
 Hana Soukupová
 Imaan Hammam
Irina Fedotova
 Jaime King
 Jessica Clarke
 Jon Kortajarena
 Julia Bergshoeff
 Kasia Smutniak
 Kate Bock
 Kati Nescher
 Kelly Gale
 Kim Noorda
 Lindsay Ellingson
 Margareth Madè
 Maryna Linchuk
 Mica Argañaraz
 Natalia Vodianova
 Paolo Roldan
 Pietro Boselli
 Raica Oliveira
 Raquel Zimmermann
 Romina Lanaro
 Sam Webb
 Sanne Vloet
 Saskia de Brauw
 Sebastian Sauve
 Shannan Click
 Tao Okamoto
 Taylor Fuchs
 Thairine Garcia
 Vanessa Axente
 Zuri Tibby
 Magda Świder

See also
 List of modeling agencies

References

External links
Official Why Not Website
Why Not Model Agency in the Fashion Model Directory.
Why Not Models in Models.com
Why Not Model Agency at Modelscouts.com
Why Not Model Agency at LatitudeTalent.com

Modeling agencies
Italian fashion
Companies based in Milan
Entertainment companies established in 1976
1976 establishments in Italy